Krasnaya is a rural locality (a settlement) and the administrative center of Gorkovskoye Rural Settlement of Verkhnetoyemsky District, Arkhangelsk Oblast, Russia. The population was 504 as of 2010.

Geography 
Krasnaya is located on the Pinega River, 111 km northeast of Verkhnyaya Toyma (the district's administrative centre) by road. Koda is the nearest rural locality.

References 

Rural localities in Verkhnetoyemsky District